Paran (also Pharan or Faran) may refer to:

Places
Paran, Egypt, an ancient site at the oasis of the Sinai's Wadi Feiran
Desert of Paran, a location mentioned in the Hebrew Bible
Paran, East Azerbaijan, a village in Iran
Paran, Isfahan, a city in Iran
Paran, Mazandaran, a village in Iran
Paran, Israel, a moshav in Israel

Other
Paran (band), a former South Korean boyband